Sir Martin Alexander Griffiths (born 27 April 1962) is a British High Court judge.  

Griffiths was educated at the City of London School and attended New College, Oxford on an open scholarship, taking a first-class BA in modern history and modern languages in 1984 which was promoted to an MA in 1988. After his undergraduate studies, he completed a graduate diploma in law at City University in 1985 and his vocational barrister training at the Inns of Court School of Law. 

He was called to the bar at Inner Temple in 1986; he volunteered at Waterloo Legal Advice Service from 1988 to 1993. In practice, he specialised in commercial law and practised from Essex Court Chambers. He took silk in 2006, served as a recorder from 2009 to 2019, and was appointed a deputy High Court judge in 2016. He was a member of the Bar Council from 2008 to 2015. 

On 1 October 2019, Griffiths was appointed a judge of the High Court and assigned to the Queen's Bench Division, replacing Dame Nicola Davies who was promoted to the Court of Appeal. He took the customary knighthood in the same year. Since 2022, he has been Presiding Judge of the Wales circuit, succeeding Sir Simon Picken.  

In 1995, he married Susan Burden (a barrister), with whom he has two sons and a daughter. He is multilingual and speaks French and Italian.

References 

Living people
1962 births
21st-century English judges
Knights Bachelor
Alumni of New College, Oxford
Members of the Inner Temple
Queen's Bench Division judges